NormalMan is an Italian radio and television series started in 2006. It became famous to the general public by comedians Lillo & Greg in their radio program "610 (sei uno zero)", broadcast on Rai Radio 2 from 2004. In 2006 it lands on television on satellite channel GXT enough to make a second season in 2007. It came available on K2 television channel in late 2009. It is starred by a character created for comics by Lillo in 1991.

Cast
Lillo, as Piermaria Carletti (NormalMan)
Greg, as most of the enemies
Virginia Raffaele, as various characters (mainly Mrs. Cassani)
Chiara Sani, as various characters
Simone Colombari, as various characters
Valentina Paoletti, as various characters
Viola Capitani, as various characters

Secondary characters
Amnesy
L'attore cane
Una barista mora
La famiglia Bocci
Il Cafone 
La signora Cassani 
Il fumatore 
Fiatella
L'indicatore
Una intrigante donzella 
Il nerd 
Petoman
Il rivelatore 
Il rockettaro 
La signora delle pulizie
Il venditore 
Il vigile urbano infame 
Zizzania

Italian comedy television series